Schausiania arpiodes is a moth in the family Cossidae. It is found in the Amazon region.

References

Cossidae